A list of South Indian silent films made between 1916–1932.

List

References

Indian silent films
Lists of films by technology
Silent South